Adrian Williams Barich (born 5 December 1963) is a sports presenter for television and radio, and a former Australian rules footballer for the West Coast Eagles and Perth Demons and rugby league player.

Early life
Barich grew up in Canberra, where he played multiple sports including rugby union (in which he represented the ACT), later as a teenager he moved over to Australian rules football and captained the first premiership for Marist College Pearce. He also played senior football for the now-defunct Manuka Football Club for three seasons and was part of their 1981 premiership team. In 1984 he moved to Perth to play for the Perth Football Club under coach Ian Miller.

Sporting career

Australian rules football

Perth Football Club
Barich played Australian rules as a midfielder, halfback flanker and winger. After moving to Perth in 1984 and signing with the Perth Football Club he went on to play 160 games for the club and earn life membership. He also captained the side for two seasons.

West Coast Eagles
Barich was an inaugural member of the West Coast Eagles and played in their historic first game in 1987. In his 47 games, Barich proved to be a robust midfielder. His place in West Coast Eagles history was forged more for his off-field role in the 1992 premiership. After missing selection in the team, he and Phil Scott, another inaugural player, penned a moving letter to those players selected to represent the club, letting their teammates know how much victory would mean to those who could not play and what it meant to those players who had been involved from club infancy.

Representative football
Barich played AFL State of Origin football for New South Wales as well as representing Western Australia three times, captaining them in 1993.

Rugby league
In 1995 he joined Western Australia's newly formed Australian Rugby League club, the Western Reds and played for two seasons. However, he only played one first grade trial game and did not make a first grade appearance. Barich also played for North Beach Sea Eagles in the WARL.

Media

Channel 7 Perth
Since 1995 Barich has been a television sports reporter and presenter with Channel 7 Perth. He was also a boundary commentator for the networks AFL coverage and part of Basil's Footy Show. He permanently became the weekend sports presenter on Seven News Perth in late 2007 following the shock death of his colleague and friend Chris Mainwaring. Barich helps organise the Chris Mainwaring match for Telethon each year.

In 2010 Barich won the coveted Geoff Christian Medal for the best football journalist in Western Australia.

6PR
Barich has a long association with radio station 6PR, going back to the late 1980s when he filled in for Graham Mabury on Nightline. In 2001 Barich paired with Basil Zempilas to co-host the breakfast program, and two and a half years later moved to Sports Today, alongside Brad Hardie and Karl Langdon. In mid-2006 Sports Today was revamped and called Sports Central.  

Barich also covered the Western Force's Super 14 matches with Mick Collis on 6PR.

He is famous for saying "thank you very much", "gornski" and pronounces numbers like Lou Richards.

Mix 94.5

In 2010 Barich left 6PR and launched a new show on Mix 94.5 called The Dead Set Legends. He co-hosted the show with Channel 7 presenter Sally Bowrey. In July 2012, Angela Tsun replaced Bowrey and the current line-up features Tania Armstrong, Damian Martin and Andrew Embley.

References

External links

West Coast Eagles past player profile

1963 births
Living people
Australian rules footballers from the Australian Capital Territory
West Coast Eagles players
Perth Football Club players
Manuka Football Club players
Western Australian State of Origin players
New South Wales Australian rules football State of Origin players
Australian rugby league players
Australian rules football commentators
Australian radio presenters
Seven News presenters
Rugby league players from Canberra